Group 5 consisted of five of the 50 teams entered into the European zone: Bulgaria, Cyprus, Israel, Luxembourg, and Russia. These five teams competed on a home-and-away basis for two of the 15 spots in the final tournament allocated to the European zone, with the group's winner and runner-up claiming those spots.

Standings

Results

Notes

External links 
Group 5 Detailed Results at RSSSF

5
1996–97 in Bulgarian football
Qual
1996–97 in Cypriot football
1997–98 in Cypriot football
1996–97 in Israeli football
1997–98 in Israeli football
1996–97 in Luxembourgian football
1997–98 in Luxembourgian football
1996 in Russian football
1997 in Russian football